In probability theory a Brownian excursion process is a stochastic process that is closely related to a Wiener process (or Brownian motion). Realisations of Brownian excursion processes are essentially just realizations of a Wiener process selected to satisfy certain conditions. In particular, a Brownian excursion process is a Wiener process conditioned to be positive and to take the value 0 at time 1. Alternatively, it is a Brownian bridge process conditioned to be positive. BEPs are important because, among other reasons, they naturally arise as the limit process of a number of conditional functional central limit theorems.

Definition

A Brownian excursion process, is a Wiener process (or Brownian motion) conditioned to be positive and to take the value 0 at time 1.   Alternatively, it is a Brownian bridge process conditioned to be positive.

Another representation of a Brownian excursion  in terms of a Brownian motion process W (due to Paul Lévy and noted by Kiyosi Itô and Henry P. McKean, Jr.)
is in terms of the last time  that W hits zero before time 1 and the first time  that Brownian motion  hits zero after time 1:

Let  be the time that a 
Brownian bridge process  achieves its minimum on [0, 1].  Vervaat (1979) shows that

Properties

In particular:

(this can also be derived by explicit calculations) and

The following result holds:

and the following values for the second moment and variance can be calculated by the exact form of the distribution and density:

A formula for a certain double transform of the distribution of this area integral is given by Louchard (1984).

For an introduction to Itô's general theory of Brownian excursions  and the Itô Poisson process of excursions, see Revuz and Yor (1994), chapter XII.

Connections and applications 

The Brownian excursion area

arises in connection with the enumeration of connected graphs, many other problems in combinatorial theory; see e.g. and the limit distribution of the Betti numbers of certain varieties in cohomology theory. Takacs (1991a) shows that  has density

Janson and Louchard (2007) show that

and

They also give higher-order expansions in both cases.

In particular,

Brownian excursions also arise in connection with 
queuing problems, 
railway traffic, and the heights of random rooted binary trees.

Related processes 

  Brownian bridge
  Brownian meander
  reflected Brownian motion
  skew Brownian motion

Notes

References

 

Wiener process